Daniel Rose Tilden (November 5, 1804 – March 4, 1890) was an American lawyer and politician who served two terms as a U.S. Representative from Ohio from 1843 to 1847.

Biography 
Born in Lebanon, Connecticut, Tilden attended the public schools.
Resided several years in Virginia and South Carolina.
He moved to Garrettsville, Ohio, about 1828, and thence to Warren, Ohio.
He studied law with Rufus P. Spalding. 
He was admitted to the bar in 1836 and commenced practice in Ravenna, Ohio.
He formed a partnership there as Spalding & Tilden.
He served as prosecuting attorney of Portage County 1838-1841.

Tilden was elected as a Whig to the Twenty-eighth and Twenty-ninth Congresses (March 4, 1843 – March 3, 1847).
He served as delegate to the Whig National Convention in 1848 and 1852.
He moved to Cleveland, Ohio, in 1852.

Tilden was elected probate judge of Cuyahoga County and served from 1855 to 1888.
He died in Cleveland, Ohio, March 4, 1890.
His remains were cremated at Buffalo, New York, and the ashes deposited in the Buffalo Crematory.

Married three times, the last to Cornelia Lossing, who survived him.

References

External links

 

1804 births
1890 deaths
People from Lebanon, Connecticut
People from Garrettsville, Ohio
Politicians from Cleveland
County district attorneys in Ohio
Whig Party members of the United States House of Representatives from Ohio
19th-century American politicians